The Coat of Arms Bridge is a grade II listed structure on the Coventry–Leamington Spa railway line in the Stivichall area of Coventry in the West Midlands of England. The bridge was built by R.B. Dockray for the London and Birmingham Railway 1844 and spans Coat of Arms Bridge Road on the edge of the city's War Memorial Park.

The bridge is built of red sandstone, and formed of a semi-elliptical central span with two smaller supporting arches which were widened in 1916. The bridge takes its name from the prominent shield above the central span which bears the coat of arms of the Gregory family of Stivichall Manor.

A similar bridge, an accommodation bridge connecting two fields, exists further down the railway line near Kenilworth. This bridge, also of stone constructions, bears two coats of arms—that of Chandos Leigh, 1st Baron Leigh (the landowner) on one side and the combined coat of arms of his wife and mother-in-law on the other.

The bridge became a listed building in 1955. A painting of the bridge by Herbert John Rylance, painted circa 1900, hangs in the Herbert Art Gallery in Coventry city centre.

References

Railway bridges in the West Midlands (county)
Grade II listed buildings in the West Midlands (county)
Bridges completed in 1844
1844 establishments in England
Bridges in Coventry